John Trengove may refer to:
 John Trengove (politician)
 John Trengove (director)